The Twenty-first Oklahoma Legislature was a meeting of the legislative branch of the government of Oklahoma, composed of the Oklahoma Senate and the Oklahoma House of Representatives. The state legislature met in regular session from January 7 to May 8, 1947, during the term of Governor Roy J. Turner. The session was marked by a gunfight on the Senate floor, in which a state representative shot Tom Anglin, a state senator and former Speaker of the Oklahoma House of Representatives, in the hip, on May 7, 1947.

James C. Nance served as President pro tempore of the Oklahoma Senate and C. R. Board served as Speaker of the Oklahoma House of Representatives.

Dates of session
Session: January 7, 1947 – May 8, 1947
Previous: 20th Legislature • Next: 22nd Legislature

Party composition

Senate

House of Representatives

Leadership

Senate
James C. Nance served as President pro tempore of the Oklahoma Senate.

House of Representatives
C. R. Board served as Speaker of the Oklahoma House of Representatives and Claud Thompson served as Speaker Pro Tempore. R. Rhys Evans served as the House Majority Floor Leader. Bob Barr served as the Chief Clerk of the Oklahoma House of Representatives.

Members

Senate

Table based on 2005 Oklahoma Almanac.

House of Representatives

Table based on government database.

References

Oklahoma legislative sessions
1947 in Oklahoma
1948 in Oklahoma
1947 U.S. legislative sessions
1948 U.S. legislative sessions